= Neuropolis =

Theatre festival in Berlin, Germany

Neuropolis is a theatre festival in Berlin, Germany.
